Tejinder Singh Rao (15 March 1931 – August 2001) was a Kenyan field hockey player. He competed in the men's tournament at the 1956 Summer Olympics.

References

External links
 

1931 births
2001 deaths
Kenyan male field hockey players
Olympic field hockey players of Kenya
Field hockey players at the 1956 Summer Olympics
Sportspeople from Mombasa
Kenyan people of Indian descent
Kenyan people of Punjabi descent
Kenyan emigrants to the United Kingdom
Sportspeople from London
British sportspeople of Indian descent
British people of Punjabi descent